DAZ-associated protein 1 is a protein that in humans is encoded by the DAZAP1 gene.

Function 

In mammals, the Y chromosome directs the development of the testes and plays an important role in spermatogenesis. A high percentage of infertile men have deletions that map to regions of the Y chromosome. The DAZ1 (Deleted in Azoospermia) gene cluster maps to the AZFc region of the Y chromosome and is deleted in many azoospermic and severely oligospermic men. It is thought that the DAZ gene cluster arose from the transposition, amplification, and pruning of the ancestral autosomal gene DAZL also involved in germ cell development and gametogenesis. This gene encodes an RNA-binding protein with two RNP motifs that was originally identified by its interaction with the infertility factors DAZ and DAZL. Two isoforms are encoded by transcript variants of this gene.

Interactions 

DAZ associated protein 1 has been shown to interact with DAZ1.

References

Further reading